The Departmental Council of Réunion is the deliberative assembly of the French overseas department of Réunion. It is made up of 50 departmental councillors, elected from the 25 cantons of Réunion.

The current president of the Réunion departmental council is Cyrille Melchior, who succeeded Nassimah Dindar (UDI) in December 2017, after her election to the Senate.

The departmental council sits at the Hôtel du département, nicknamed the Palais de la Source in Saint-Denis.

Vice-presidents

References 

Réunion
Politics of Réunion